Out to Win (步步为赢) is a television serial set in modern-day Singapore. Produced by MediaCorp TV Channel 8, it starred Fann Wong in drama about a self-centred futures trader who gradually alienates her friends and family by doing whatever it takes to rise up the corporate ladder. It is only through a car crash that she learns to empathise with the victim and learns the meaning of life.

This serial won Fann Wong a Best Actress nomination at Singapore's Star Awards 1999 and the viewership rating for this serial exceeded 30% during the last episode.

Cast 
 Fann Wong - Coco Zhang Wenhua 
 Ix Shen - Lin Zhengdong 
 Lynn Poh - Chen Xiaoyan 
 Lin Yisheng - Li Ziqiang 
 Tracer Wong - Irene Wong 
 Sean Say - He Ziyang

Awards & Nominations

External links 

1999 Singaporean television series debuts
1990s Singaporean television series
Singapore Chinese dramas
Channel 8 (Singapore) original programming